Jake Brockman may refer to:

 Jake Drake-Brockman (1955–2009), English musician
Jake Brockman (Outnumbered), fictional character